The Grunehogna Peaks are a group of peaks  north of the Liljequist Heights, in the south part of Ahlmann Ridge in Queen Maud Land, Antarctica. They were photographed from the air by the Third German Antarctic Expedition (1938–39). They were mapped by Norwegian cartographers from surveys and air photos by the Norwegian–British–Swedish Antarctic Expedition (1949–52) and the Norwegian expedition (1958–59) and named Grunehogna.

The summer research station Sarie Marais was erected at Grunehogna for geological, geophysical, and surveying programs in the 1982/1983 summer by the South African National Antarctic Programme and decommissioned in the 2001/2002 summer season.

References

Mountains of Queen Maud Land
Princess Martha Coast